Transcutaneous oxygen measurement (TCOM or TcPO2) is a non-invasive method of measuring the oxygen level of the tissue below the skin. Since oxygen is carried by the blood, TCOM can be used as an indirect measure of blood flow to the tissue. Since blood flow is important for wound healing, TCOM is often used to gauge the ability of tissue to effectively heal.

To perform the test, one set of electrodes are placed on viable tissue (e.g. the chest) as a control and a second set is placed around the tissue in question (e.g. legs or feet). The electrodes may mildly heat the skin to increase blood flow into the area. Oxygen may also be given to the patient to see if that increases oxygen levels in the tissue. The test takes about 45 minutes. Results are reported either as the absolute values of the tissue in question (in mmHg) or as a ratio of the tissue in question to the control tissue. The normal oxygen tension in the foot is approximately 60 mmHg, and the normal chest/foot ratio is approximately 0.9. Many factors can limit the accuracy of the test including edema, temperature, inflammation, medications, and stress. In addition for the measurement to be normal, all parts of the oxygenation pathway must be functioning: the lungs must be able to oxygenate the blood, the heart must be able to pump the blood, and a patent artery must be able to carry blood to the skin.

Without comorbitities, wounds are thought to be able to heal if the oxygen tension is >40 mmHg. In the presence of comorbities, such as diabetes or edema, a higher value is likely needed. Patients with oxygen tensions <20 mmHg are likely to need revascularization to promote adequate wound healing. The required TCOM level for adequate wound healing, however, remains controversial.

References

Medical tests